In 1955, a general election was held for the first time. 52 seats were contested, with the majority party earning the right to appoint seven more. In the election, the Alliance Party contested all 52 seats and won 51, while the Pan-Malayan Islamic Party won the remaining seat. Following the elections, Raja Uda Raja Muhammad was elected as the Speaker of the Council, similar to the present Speaker of the Dewan Rakyat.

This is a list of the members of the Federal Legislative Council, elected in 1955.

Composition

Elected members by state

Perlis

Kedah

Kelantan

Trengganu

Penang-Province Wellesley

Perak

Pahang

Selangor

Negri Sembilan

Malacca

Johore

Appointed and nominated members

References

Federation of Malaya
Political history of Malaya
Federal Legislative Council
20th-century Malaysian people